Lillie Rosa Minoka-Hill (1876–1952) was a Native American physician of Mohawk descent. Minnetoga, was her birth given last name according to an early record of her birth. Although, throughout her life, her name was changed three times; once at her birth, once when the Allen family forcefully adopted her, and a final time when she was given an Oneida name after working in the community for many years. Her favorite name to go by, was her third name, because it represented a high amount of honor that she had earned while treating the people, both white and non-white in Oneida.  After her mother died, she was adopted by Joshua Allen, a Quaker in Philadelphia. She later graduated from the Women's Medical College of Pennsylvania, becoming the second Native American female doctor in the United States, after Susan La Flesche Picotte (Omaha). Her life is remarkable because of the time period she was born into. She was born just after the battle of Little Big Horn and died while relocation of Native Americans was still happening. She lived in a time of discrimination against women, and people of color, especially in the medical field.

She married an Oneida man, Charles Hill, in 1905 and returned with him to his reservation in Wisconsin. For decades she operated a "kitchen clinic" at her house, providing care for Oneida on the reservation. She gained her state medical license in Wisconsin in 1934 and, in her later years, was honored for her contributions to rural medical care. In 1946, a heart attack prevented her from making house calls, however, the kitchen-clinic remained open. In 1947 she was adopted by the Oneida Nation of Wisconsin, the only person so honored in the 20th century. They gave her the name Yo-da-gent, meaning “she who saves” or “she who carries help”. Minoka-Hill lived through many hardships and yet continued her practice.

Early life
Lillie Minoka was born 30 August 1875 into the Mohawk Nation on the St. Regis Mohawk Indian Reservation (also known as Akwesasne) in northern New York. This birth information is according to a family story, and not based on an actual birth document, which would not be uncommon for Native Americans at the time. The information about her place of birth and name come from her adoptive father. Her mother died soon after giving birth, and Lillie was raised by her mother's Mohawk family, but Minoka-Hill was denied the knowledge of her Mohawk mother. Because of historical conflicts between American Indian and European-American cultures, Dr. Minoka-Hill's life contains both mysteries and tensions.

During the time of her upbringing, it was common for Native American children and families to be relocated and forced to assimilate. Then they were forced into boarding schools, which was a huge source of trauma for many people during the time, including Lillie. While it appears that when Lillie was about five, her family allowed her to be adopted by Joshua Allen and his wife, Lillie's family did not consent to the removal from the family. She was forcibly taken and adopted by Joshua Allen and his wife, who then brought her to Philadelphia in 1881. This removal and separation of her and her family is a very significant and dramatic start to her life. He was a Quaker doctor in Philadelphia, and they promised to educate the girl. He named her Rosa because to him, "she looked more like a little rose than a lily.” As soon as she was able to attend school, she did in Philadelphia. However, she felt out of place with her new family and described her new life as "little wooden Indian who hardly dared look right or left." She attended the Grahame Institute, a Quaker boarding school for girls in Philadelphia that was owned and operated by Allen's sister.

In 1895 Minoka graduated. She went for further study to a Catholic convent in Quebec, Canada, where she learned French. She remained in Quebec for one year. She then decided to become a nurse after graduating from high school, but soon after setting up a private practice she decided to attend medical school. Minoka attended the Women's Medical College of Pennsylvania (now part of Drexel University), where she earned her degree in 1899. She struggled with assimilating into an entirely different and new culture with her husband. She was the second Native American woman in the United States to obtain a medical degree, after Susan La Flesche Picotte (Omaha).

Spirituality
Despite the fact that Minoka-Hill was raised to be Catholic, she still practiced traditional Native American spirituality. Her Native American spirituality likely arose when she began her practice at Oneida. The people there mostly practiced religion this way, as well as speaking the language, and using their herbal remedies. In this way, she was able to learn about a culture she could identify with, despite being a Mohawk.

Early career
In 1900, while working at the Lincoln Institute in Philadelphia (a charity school for Indian girls that had originally been established for orphaned children of soldiers in 1866 in her home on Chestnut Street by Miss Mary McHenry; not to be confused with the historically black Lincoln University in Chester County), Minoka met Anna Hill, an Oneida student from Wisconsin. Anna introduced Minoka to her brother Charles Abram Hill. They married in 1905.

For five years after her graduation, Minoka continued her work at the Lincoln Institute. She also cared for women and children as an intern at the Women's Hospital in Philadelphia. After her internship, she set up a private practice with a friend, Francis Tyson, at the Lincoln Institute. Because she was practicing during the tim of the first world war, her services were greatly needed and used on her reservation.

Marriage and family
In 1905 Charles Hill proposed to her, asking her to join him in Oneida, Wisconsin on his tribal reservation. She knew that life would be difficult in the rural area, but she agreed. Charles wanted a farmer's wife, though she wanted to stay active in her medical practice. They compromised and she became the sole physician in Oneida while also maintaining the house and children. They had six children together, three boys and three girls. According to her children, much of her early life was not disclosed to them. Josephine Hill Cote was one of her youngest daughters, who was also a twin.

In 1916, Charles died of a sudden attack of appendicitis; their twins were only five months old. The farm and livestock were mortgaged, and Minoka-Hill had to manage the debt. When Charles Hill died in 1916, Minoka-Hill had six children, ranging in age from 5 months to 9 years, and a mortgaged farm with no running water or electricity. Although she could have returned to Philadelphia and received financial assistance from her family, she remained in Wisconsin as she saw helping Indians as her calling. In 1918, their children contracted influenza during the international epidemic, but all survived. In 1922 their daughter Rosa Melissa Hill died from typhoid fever. She saw the majority of her patients after her husband passed away.

Medical practice
On the reservation, Minoka-Hill ran a “kitchen clinic” for 40 years from her house. A wood-burning stove, water carried in from a hand-pump down the road, and, after 1946, an electric refrigerator for medicines: with this minimal equipment in her "kitchen clinic". She incorporated herbal remedies learned from Oneida medicine men and women. She made many house calls, teaching the people about nutrition, sanitation, and preventive medicine. If she needed to make a house call, she was able to get rides from her family members or community members, because she did not have a car. If getting a ride from her sons was not an option, she walked to the houses. Because cash was scarce in the rural economy, she accepted food, such as chickens, as payment for her services. She adjusted her fees according to what the patient could pay: she sometimes charged $15 for the delivery of a baby, or two chickens, or $9, depending on the family's situation.

Popular among white and Oneida patients alike, Minoka-Hill earned the trust of local Oneidas who did not feel comfortable with the white doctors of Brown County. The local physicians were supportive of her work. She worked alongside a midwife named Priscilla Manders up until the 1940s, when her practice became illegal, most likely due to the absence of her medical license. Priscilla lived in the Oneida village, worked at a nearby museum, and spoke the language. She was no doubt an important character in the story of Minoka-Hill and her transition into Oneida and its medical practices.

During World War I, in 1916 the only official federal doctor on the Oneida reservation was called away to serve the military. After that, Minoka-Hill's services were even more critical; she tended to nearly all the tribe's local medical needs. She often spent entire nights at bedsides. She carried her heavy medical bag and walked to most of her patients over miles of dirt and gravel roads; in winter she used snowshoes. Minoka-Hill practiced medicine on a poor midwestern reservation, despite the high rates of influenza, pneumonia, and tuberculosis, which took the lives of many during this time.

In 1929, her trust fund, established by her father Joshua Allen, collapsed in the Stock Market Crash that began the Great Depression. Even though the federal government established a Relief Office in Oneida, they could neither send patients to Minoka-Hill, nor reimburse her for services rendered because she had never taken the time to obtain a Wisconsin medical license. Despite this, Minoka-Hill kept running her “kitchen clinic” through all of it, and continued for the rest of her life.

In 1934, local physicians loaned her the $100 needed to pay for the application fee to gain her medical license. Being licensed allowed her to admit patients to the hospital. After taking the necessary tests, she received the credential. She continued to practice for a humble price in order to continue to treat the low-income people on her reservation. She also thought that charging lower prices would help her get into heaven. At the age of 58, 35 years after medical school graduation, she received her Wisconsin license and continued her practice in Oneida

In 1939, under programs of the New Deal of the President Franklin D. Roosevelt administration to improve conditions for Native Americans, a public health nurse and a government doctor were assigned to the reservation. That year, the federal government also started providing food supplements to combat malnutrition.

A heart attack in 1946 forced Minoka-Hill into semi-retirement, though she continued her “kitchen clinic”. She also set up a boarding school to help poor Native American children. In her later years, she was recognized by the University of Wisconsin College of Agriculture, the State Medical Society of Wisconsin, the American Medical Association, the Indian Council Fire of Chicago, and the Oneida Nation for her contributions to the health of the people in Oneida. She was able to attend the American Medical Convention in Atlantic City, New Jersey for her recognition. She continued to practice medical services as best as she could, with her health in consideration, until her death in Fond du Lac, Wisconsin on March 18, 1952.

Legacy and honors
1947, she received the Indian Achievement Award from the Indian Fire Council of Chicago, for personal achievement and humanitarian service to her people.
1947, Thanksgiving Day, she was adopted by the Oneida Nation of Wisconsin; the only person in the 20th century to be officially adopted by them. They gave her the name Yo-da-gent, meaning “she who saves” or “she who carries help”. At the tribal adoption ceremony, Minoka-Hill said:
 “It was 42 years last June since I came here to live. I was the bride of one of your tribe. I found I was to have good friends and kind neighbors. It has been a privilege to be helpful to those in need of help and to do it cheerfully and as promptly as I could. Because I felt it was the Master’s work assigned to me I must therefore be a willing worker ---though sometimes a very weary worker. Today you have honored me in a special way by taking me for your ‘almost sister’, now I can say to many of you ‘daughter’, ‘son’, ‘grandchild’. And you can say to me Hocsote. Let me express my hearty thanks for your recognition and adoption."

1948, a monument was erected in Oneida, Wisconsin in her honor.
1948, the University of Wisconsin College of Agriculture recognized her for service to rural people. 
1949, she was the honoree of the American Medical Association at its annual conference, held that year in Atlantic City. 
1949, the Wisconsin Medical Association voted to award her a lifetime honorary membership. When she received the announcement letter, she said, “As much as I appreciate kind thoughts, I do not relish too much publicity!”
1952, a granite monument was erected near Oneida in her honor. The inscription reads: “Physician, Good Samaritan, and friend of People of all religions in this community, erected to her memory by the Indians and white people.” It includes: “I was sick and you visited me.”
1959, Haskell Indian College named a new girl's dormitory as “Minoka Hall” in her honor.
1975, her son Norbert Hill established the Dr. Rosa Minoka Hill Fund, which grants college scholarships to Native Americans.
A granddaughter, now known as Roberta Hill Whiteman, became a poet and professor.

References

Further reading 
Scharf, John Thomas, History of Philadelphia, 1609-1884, Thompson Westcott - Philadelphia (Pa.) - 1884, page 1698.

“Changing the Face of Medicine | Lillie Rosa Minoka-Hill.” U.S. National Library of Medicine, National Institutes of Health, 3 June 2015, cfmedicine.nlm.nih.gov/physicians/biography_226.html.
Greta Anderson, More Than Petticoats, Remarkable Wisconsin Women, TwoDot, 2004
Roberta Jean Hill, Dr. Lillie Rosa Minoka-Hill: Mohawk Woman Physician, University of Minnesota, 1998

External links
 "Lillie Rosa Minoka-Hill", Women and Public Health, American Public Health Association
 Lillie Rosa Minoka-Hill", Women Physicians, Drexel University College of Medicine, photographs of Minoka-Hill in 1946 at her practice

1876 births
1952 deaths
20th-century Native Americans
20th-century American physicians
20th-century American women physicians
American Mohawk people
Drexel University alumni
Native American physicians
Oneida people
People from Franklin County, New York
People from Oneida, Wisconsin
Physicians from Wisconsin
20th-century Native American women
Native American people from Wisconsin
Native American people from New York (state)